The Rio Grande Association was a Class D minor baseball league that lasted for less than one season, 1915.

History
The league initially consisted of six teams based in Texas, Arizona and New Mexico: the Albuquerque Dukes, Douglas Miners, El Paso Mackmen, Las Cruces Farmers, Phoenix Senators and Tucson Old Pueblos. By May 24, the Miners and Farmers had disbanded and on July 6, the league disbanded. The league was founded by John McCloskey, who also founded the Texas League.

Each team that appeared in the Rio Grande Association was the first professional baseball team to come out of their respective cities, often predating their successors by many years. For example, after its appearance in the Association, Phoenix and Tucson did not again have a professional team until 1928; El Paso until 1930; Albuquerque until 1932; Douglas until 1948 and Las Cruces until 2010.

The league officially started after a meeting held at the Hotel Sheldon, at El Paso, Texas, February 18, 1915.

On May 4 the league was officially accepted into the National Association of Professional Baseball Leagues. Tucson hosted Opening day April 26, Tucson defeated Phoenix 10-2.

Nearly a month into the season, May 24, the Douglas and Las Cruces teams were dropped from the league due to financial difficulties. The teams' records were 5-13 and 5-14 respectively.

At a league meeting held at El Paso, July 5, it was decided to close the league because of sustaining losses.

The league featured multiple notable players and managers, including those who would attain major league experience and those who had major league experience. They include Kitty Brashear, Frank Huelsman (who led the league with ten home runs), Rudy Kallio, Stoney McGlynn and Herb Hall.

Cities Represented 
 Albuquerque, NM: Albuquerque Dukes 1915 
 Douglas, AZ: Douglas Miners 1915 
 El Paso, TX: El Paso Mackmen 1915 
 Las Cruces, NM: Las Cruces Farmers 1915 
 Phoenix, AZ: Phoenix Senators 1915 
 Tucson, AZ: Tucson Old Pueblos 1915

1915 Rio Grande Association
  Douglas and Las Cruces disbanded May 24. The league disbanded July 6.

References

Defunct minor baseball leagues in the United States
Baseball leagues in Texas
Baseball leagues in Arizona
Baseball leagues in New Mexico
Sports leagues established in 1915
Sports leagues disestablished in 1915